Dasypeltis scabra, known as the common egg eater, egg-eating snake or rhombic egg eater, is a species of colubrid snake endemic to Africa.

Geographic range
Dasypeltis scabra is found in sub-Saharan Africa. It can also be found in Saudi Arabia and in other countries of the Middle East.

Description
Dorsally, it has a series of rhomboidal dark brown spots on a lighter background. There is an alternating series of brown spots on each side and a distinct V-shaped mark at the back of the neck. Ventrally it is yellowish, either uniform or with dark dots.

Mimicry
It has been suggested that non-venomous Dasypeltis scabra is a mimic of venomous Echis carinatus, the saw-scaled viper, which it strongly resembles.

D. scabra also closely resembles Causus rhombeatus, the rhombic night adder. These two species may be distinguished by the shape of the pupil of the eye. Snakes of the genus Dasypeltis have vertical pupils, whereas snakes of the genus Causus have round pupils. However, it is possible in darker areas for the vertical eyes to become round, so this is not necessarily an accurate means of distinguishing the species.

Habitat
Dasypeltis scabra can be found in a variety of habitats. They are not found in closed-canopy forests nor in true deserts, but do inhabit most ecosystems between these extremes.

Behavior
The rhombic egg eater is nocturnal. Although mainly terrestrial, it is a good climber and is known to scale rock outcroppings and climb trees to raid birds' nests.

Diet
Dasypeltis scabra feeds exclusively on eggs. The lining of the mouth has small, parallel ridges, very similar to human fingerprints, which aid in grasping the shell of an egg. Once swallowed, the egg is punctured by specialized vertebral hypapophyses which extend into the esophagus. The shell is then regurgitated in one piece, and its contents passed along to the stomach.

Defense
When disturbed, D. scabra inflates itself, "hisses" by rapidly rubbing together the rough, keeled scales on the side of its body, and strikes with its mouth kept wide open.

Reproduction
D. scabra is oviparous. In summer, a sexually mature female may lay one or two clutches of 6-25 eggs each. The eggs measure .

Subspecies
Two subspecies are recognized, including the nominotypical subspecies.

Dasypeltis scabra loveridgei Mertens, 1954
Dasypeltis scabra scabra (Linnaeus, 1758)

The subspecific name, loveridgei, is in honor of British herpetologist Arthur Loveridge.

References

Further reading
Linnaeus C (1758). Systema naturae per regna tria naturae, secundum classes, ordines, genera, species, cum characteribus, differentiis, synonymis, locis. Tomus I. Editio Decima, Reformata. Stockholm: L. Salvius. 824 pp. (Coluber scaber, new species, p. 223). (in Latin).
Mertens R (1954). "Neue Schlangenrassen aus Südwest- und Südafrika". Zoologischer Anzeiger 152: 213-219. (Dasypeltis scabra loveridgei, new subspecies). (in German).
Morris PA (1948). Boy's Book of Snakes: How to Recognize and Understand Them. A volume of the Humanizing Science Series, edited by Jaques Cattell. New York: Ronald Press. viii + 185 pp. (Dasypeltis scaber, pp. 143, 181).

Colubrids
Snakes of Africa
Reptiles described in 1758
Taxa named by Carl Linnaeus
Endemic fauna of Saudi Arabia